Dedeler is a village in the Silopi district of Şırnak Province in Turkey. The village had a population of 23 in 2021.

References 

Villages in Silopi District
Kurdish settlements in Şırnak Province